The Gazette is a daily print newspaper and online news source published in the American city of Cedar Rapids, Iowa. The first paper was published as an evening journal, branded the Evening Gazette, on Wednesday, January 10, 1883. The newspaper is distributed throughout northeastern and east-central Iowa, including the Cedar Rapids and Iowa City metropolitan areas. It was formerly called The Cedar Rapids Gazette. As of September 2019, The Gazette has a circulation of 32,616 for the daily edition and 37,860 for the Sunday edition.

The employee-owned Folience parent owns Gazette Communications, Inc. (formerly "The Gazette Company" and "Gazette Communications" and "SourceMedia Group") which publishes The Gazette and other newspapers including the Penny Saver in Linn County and the Community News Advertiser in Johnson County.

The Gazette Company owned KCRG-TV9  (the call letters stand for Cedar Rapids Gazette) until selling it to Gray Television, with the transfer being completed on October 1, 2015. The company also owned KCRG radio (1600 AM) until selling the station to the owners of another local broadcaster, KZIA FM 102.9. The sale was completed on October 31, 2006, with the radio station's call letters changing to KGYM as a result. SourceMedia Group also owned Decisionmark, which runs the TitanTV website, until selling it to a syndicate led by Turnstone Capital and Capitol Broadcasting Company.

In 2019, Gazette Communications, Inc employed roughly 125 people.

References

External links

 

Mass media in Cedar Rapids, Iowa
Newspapers published in Iowa
Pulitzer Prize for Public Service winners
Newspapers established in 1883
1883 establishments in Iowa